$9.99 is a 2008 Australian stop-motion adult animated drama film written and directed by Tatia Rosenthal, with the screenplay by Etgar Keret. The film marks the third collaboration between Rosenthal and Keret. It features a voice cast of Geoffrey Rush, Samuel Johnson, Anthony LaPaglia, Joel Edgerton, Ben Mendelsohn, and Claudia Karvan.

Plot 
The film mainly focuses on Dave Peck, who is unemployed but prefers the search for the meaning of life to the search for gainful employment. While looking in a magazine, Dave finds an advertisement for a book that will tell him the meaning of life "for the low price of $9.99." Dave, fascinated by this, begins his journey in his Sydney apartment to find the true meaning of life.

As the film progresses, stories of Dave's family and neighbours are woven in and examine the post-modern meaning of hope.

Cast 
 Geoffrey Rush as The Angel / Homeless Man
 Anthony LaPaglia as Jim
 Samuel Johnson as Dave
 Claudia Karvan as Michelle
 Joel Edgerton as Ron
 Barry Otto as Albert
 Leeanna Walsman as Tanita
 Ben Mendelsohn as Lenny
 Jamie Katsamatsas as Zack
 Brian Meagan as Clement
 Roy Billing as Marcus Portman / Policeman #1

Release and reception 
$9.99 premiered at the Toronto International Film Festival on 4 September 2008. The film was then released in Los Angeles and New York on 19 June 2009 and then in Australia on 17 September 2009. Upon release, the film earned mostly positive reviews. As of February 2019, it holds a "Fresh" score of 73% on the film review website Rotten Tomatoes with an average rating of 6.5 out of 10, according with 55 reviews. The site's critical consensus states, "Its storyline isn't as wondrous as its visuals, but $9.99 has a sophistication and handmade charm that sets it apart from the animated pack." Metacritic gave the film 68/100 based on 15 critics giving it generally favorable reviews.

Box office 
$9.99 took $47,300 at the box office in Australia. The film's worldwide total was $708,354.

Awards and nominations 
 Winner of the Audience Award for best feature at FICCO 2009
 Winner of EXXONMOBIL best female director Award at FICCO 2009
 Winner of Anima Brussels BeTV best feature Award 2009
 Winner of the Grand Prize at Monstra Lisbon Animated film Festival 2009

The film has been nominated for the Annie Awards for Best Animated Feature and Directing in an Animated Feature Production.

References

External links 
 
 
 
 The Numbers

2008 films
2008 animated films
Animated drama films
Australian animated feature films
Australian adult animated films
Israeli animated films
English-language Israeli films
Clay animation films
2000s stop-motion animated films
2000s Australian animated films
2000s English-language films